Exceed And Excel (foaled 5 September 2000) is a retired multiple Group 1 winning Australian thoroughbred racehorse.  After his racing career ended he has been successful as a breeding stallion, having sired over 150 Stakes winners.

Background
The colt was purchased at the 2002 Inglis Easter yearling sale by his trainer Tim Martin.  Martin had previously never paid more than $30,000 for a horse but purchased him for A$375,000.  At the time, he had no future owner in line for the horse.  After what Martin described as a "scary" two weeks, he drew Sydney lawyer Alan Osburg into a 50% interest while the remaining equity was later taken by businessman Nick Moraitis.

Racing career
In Australia he only raced as a two-year-old and three-year-old.  His main success came as a three-year-old when he won the Group 1 Dubai Racing Club Cup and the Newmarket Handicap, on both occasions ridden by Corey Brown.   His last race was in the 2004 July Cup in England but he finished unplaced.

Stud career
Exceed And 
was sold to Darley Stud for a reported record A$ 22 million.

Notable stock

Exceed And Excel has sired 16 individual Group 1 winners:

c = colt, f = filly, g = gelding

Pedigree

References 

Australian racehorses
Racehorses bred in Australia
Racehorses trained in Australia
2000 racehorse births
Thoroughbred family 23-b